Plassac is the name of several communes in France:
 Plassac, Charente-Maritime, in the Charente-Maritime department
 Plassac, Gironde, in the Gironde department